Philipp Sigmund of Dietrichstein (9 March 1651 – 3 July 1716), was a German prince member of the House of Dietrichstein.

He was the fourth child and third (but second surviving) son of Maximilian, 2nd Prince of Dietrichstein zu Nikolsburg, and his second wife Sophie Agnes, a daughter of Wolfgang III, Count of Mansfeld-Vorderort-Bornstädt.

Life

In 1680, Philipp Sigmund married firstly with Marie Elisabeth Hofmann, Baroness of Grünbühel-Strechau (1663 – 21 January 1705). They had three children:

 Maria Anna Franziska Eva (10 August 1681 – 1704), married on 25 April 1700 to Count Johann Wenzel of Gallas.
 Marie Ernestine (13 July 1683 – 30 January 1745), married firstly on 26 October 1716 to Count Johann Wenzel of Gallas (widower of her older sister) and secondly on 8 June 1721 to Count Aloys Thomas of Harrach-Rohrau-Thannhausen.
 Emanuel Joseph Johann (18 March 1690 – 27 October 1703).

After 1705, Philipp Sigmund married secondly with Dorothea Josepha, Baroness Jankovská z Vlašimi (1666 – 31 May 1742). They had no children.

Notes

1651 births
1716 deaths
Dietrichstein family